Kiril Dinchev (born 8 May 1989 in Sofia) is a former Bulgarian footballer who played as a defender. He retired in 2016, at the age of 27.

Honours

Club
CSKA Sofia
 Bulgarian Cup: 2015–16

Career statistics

References

External links
 

1989 births
Living people
Bulgarian footballers
Akademik Sofia players
FC Botev Vratsa players
PFC Litex Lovech players
FK Pelister players
PFC CSKA Sofia players
First Professional Football League (Bulgaria) players
Expatriate footballers in North Macedonia
Expatriate footballers in Greece
Association football defenders